Ziminsky District is an administrative district, one of the thirty-three in Irkutsk Oblast, Russia. Municipally, it is incorporated as Ziminsky Municipal District. Its administrative center is the town of Zima (which is not administratively a part of the district). Population:  14,420 (2002 Census);

Administrative and municipal status
Within the framework of administrative divisions, Ziminsky District is one of the thirty-three in the oblast. The town of Zima serves as its administrative center, despite being incorporated separately as an administrative unit with the status equal to that of the districts.

As a municipal division, the district is incorporated as Ziminsky Municipal District. The Town of Zima is incorporated separately from the district as Ziminskoye Urban Okrug.

References

Notes

Sources

Districts of Irkutsk Oblast
